Salzburg (also known as Salzburgerland) is a state (Land) of the modern Republic of Austria. It is officially named Land Salzburg to distinguish it from its eponymous capital — the city of Salzburg. For centuries, it was an independent Prince-Bishopric of the Holy Roman Empire.

Geography

Location
It stretches along its main river — the Salzach – which rises in the Central Eastern Alps in the south to the Alpine foothills in the north. It is located in the north-west of Austria, close to the border with the German state of Bavaria; to the northeast lies the state of Upper Austria; to the east the state of Styria; to the south the states of Carinthia and Tyrol. With 529,085 inhabitants, it is one of the country's smaller states in terms of population.

Running through the south are the main ranges of the Alpine divide (incl. the Hohe Tauern mountains) with numerous three-thousanders. The Dachstein massif and the Berchtesgaden Alps ranges of the Northern Limestone Alps border Salzburg Land to the east and north.

Regions
The state is traditionally subdivided in five major regions (Gaue), congruent with its political districts (Bezirke, see administrative divisions).

In the northern part:
Flachgau (Salzburg city and environs), the flat Salzburg Basin around the confluence of Salzach and Saalach, stretching from the slopes of the Salzkammergut Mountains in the east to the Untersberg massif and the Chiemgau Alps in the west.
Tennengau (district capital Hallein), named after the Tennen Mountains, including the broad Salzach Valley south of Salzburg and the surrounding ranges of the Limestone Alps.
The southern, mountainous (colloquially Innergebirg) part is divided into:
Pinzgau (Zell am See) in the southwest,
Pongau (Sankt Johann im Pongau) on Salzach and Enns, and
Lungau (Tamsweg) in the southeast, separated by the Niedere Tauern range.

Major cities and towns
Salzburg municipalities with town privileges:

  Salzburg city (pop. 148,521)
  Hallein (20,022)
  Saalfelden (16,046)
  Sankt Johann im Pongau (10,740)
  Bischofshofen (10,352)
  Zell am See (9,683)
  Seekirchen (9,945)
  Neumarkt am Wallersee (5,846)
  Oberndorf bei Salzburg (5,600)
  Mittersill (5,443)
  Radstadt (4,864)

Wals-Siezenheim, a common municipality with about 12,000 inhabitants, is known as 'Austria's largest village'.

History

Salt has played an important role in the region's development; Salzburg means "salt castle".

Salzburg as an independent state
Independence from Bavaria was secured in the late 14th century. The Archbishopric of Salzburg was an independent prince-bishopric and State of the Holy Roman Empire until German Mediatisation in 1803.

Electorate of Salzburg

The territory was secularized and, as the Electorate of Salzburg, given as compensation to Ferdinand III, former Grand Duke of Tuscany, the brother of Emperor Francis II.

The end of independence
Following the Austrian defeat at Austerlitz in 1805, Salzburg was annexed by Austria as compensation for the loss of Tyrol to the Kingdom of Bavaria, and Ferdinand was transferred to the Grand Duchy of Würzburg.

Bavarian Salzburg
After Austria's defeat in 1809, the province was handed over to Bavaria in 1810.

The country divided between Bavaria and Austria
In 1816, following the defeat of Napoleon and the provision of adequate compensation to Bavaria at the Congress of Vienna, it was returned to Austria with the exception of the north-western Rupertiwinkel which remained Bavarian. The Salzburger Land was administered as the department of Salzach from Linz, the capital of Upper Austria. In 1849 the Duchy of Salzburg was established as a crown land of the Austrian Empire and, after 1866, Austria-Hungary.

World War I
Salzburg participated in World War I, as part of the Austro-Hungarian Empire. 49,000 Salzburgers were called to arms, of whom 6,000 were killed.

Post-World War I Austrian Republics

In 1918 after World War I, the Duchy of Salzburg was dissolved and replaced with the State of Salzburg, as a component part initially of German Austria and subsequently of the First Republic of Austria, the separate state which was mandated by the Allied powers.

Salzburg in Germany
In the Anschluss, Austria, including Salzburg state, was incorporated into Nazi Germany in 1938.

American control
After the defeat of Nazi Germany in 1945, the Allies occupied the territory of Austria, being recognized as an independent territory under their rule. Salzburg was occupied by the United States.

Salzburg as an Austrian State
In 1955 Austria was again declared independent of the Allies and Salzburg was once again one of the reconstituted federal states of the second Republic Austria.

Demographics
The historical population is given in the following chart:

Politics
Salzburg adopted its current state constitution in 1999. The state government (Landesregierung) is headed by a Landeshauptmann (governor), who is elected by a majority in the Landtag parliament. State elections are held every five years.

After World War II, most state governments were led by the conservative Austrian People's Party (ÖVP). The ÖVP politician Josef Klaus (1910-2001), later Chancellor of Austria, served as Landeshauptmann from 1949 to 1961. In 2004 Gabi Burgstaller became the first Social Democratic (and first female) Salzburg governor.

The last results, in April 2018 (compared to 2013) were:

The elected Salzburg Landeshauptmann is Wilfried Haslauer (ÖVP), chairing a coalition government of ÖVP, Greens and NEOS ministers (Landesräte). The current president (speaker) of the Salzburg Landtag is his party fellow Brigitta Pallauf.

Government

Landeshauptmann Wilfried Haslauer (ÖVP)
 Economy
 Tourism
 Employment market 
 Municipality administration
 Education
 Internal affairs
 Fire departments
 Public safety
 Governor's office
 European affairs.

1st Deputy Astrid Rössler (Greens)
 Conservation
 Environmentalism
 Water protection
 Trade
 Regional development
 Building law.

2nd Deputy Christian Stöckl (ÖVP)
 Finance
 State properties and interests
 Public health and hospitals.

Landesräte
 Hans Mayr (TS): Transport, infrastructure, housing
 Martina Berthold (Greens): Childcare, adult education, universities, research, science, youth, family affairs, intergenerational relationships, desegregation, migration, sports, women's affairs, equal opportunities
 Josef Schwaiger (ÖVP): Agriculture, forestry, water management, energy, personnel management
 Heinrich Schellhorn (Greens): Social policy, care nursing, culture, folk culture, museums.

Administrative divisions

Districts 
The State of Salzburg comprises six districts, known as Bezirke or vernacularly Gaue:

Hallein District (Tennengau region)
St. Johann im Pongau District (Pongau region)
Salzburg-Umgebung District (Salzburg environs) (Flachgau region)
Tamsweg District (Lungau region)
Zell am See District (Pinzgau region)

Salzburg city is its own administrative district.

Municipalities
The state is divided into 119 municipalities, including Salzburg city. 11 of them have city status (Städte), 24 are market towns (Marktgemeinden) and the other 84 are simple municipalities (Gemeinden). Below is a list of all the municipalities divided by district:

Hallein District (Tennengau) (13 municipalities): Abtenau, Adnet, Annaberg-Lungötz, Bad Vigaun, Golling an der Salzach, Hallein, Krispl, Kuchl, Oberalm, Puch bei Hallein, Rußbach am Paß Gschütt, Sankt Koloman, Scheffau am Tennengebirge.
Salzburg-Umgebung District (Flachgau) (37 municipalities): Anif, Anthering, Bergheim, Berndorf, Bürmoos, Dorfbeuern, Ebenau, Elixhausen, Elsbethen, Eugendorf, Faistenau, Fuschl am See, Großgmain, Göming, Grödig, Hallwang, Henndorf, Hintersee, Hof bei Salzburg, Koppl, Köstendorf, Lamprechtshausen, Mattsee, Neumarkt am Wallersee, Nußdorf am Haunsberg, Oberndorf bei Salzburg, Obertrum, Plainfeld, Sankt Georgen, Sankt Gilgen, Schleedorf, Seeham, Seekirchen, Straßwalchen, Strobl, Thalgau, Wals-Siezenheim.
St. Johann im Pongau District (Pongau) (25 municipalities): Altenmarkt im Pongau, Bad Gastein, Bad Hofgastein, Bischofshofen, Dorfgastein, Eben im Pongau, Filzmoos, Flachau, Forstau, Goldegg, Grossarl, Hüttau, Hüttschlag, Kleinarl, Mühlbach am Hochkönig, Pfarrwerfen, Radstadt, Sankt Johann im Pongau, Sankt Martin am Tennengebirge, Sankt Veit im Pongau, Schwarzach im Pongau, Untertauern, Wagrain, Werfen, Werfenweng.
Tamsweg District (Lungau) (15 municipalities): Göriach, Lessach, Mariapfarr, Mauterndorf, Muhr, Ramingstein, Sankt Andrä im Lungau, Sankt Margarethen im Lungau, Sankt Michael im Lungau, Tamsweg, Thomatal, Tweng, Unternberg, Weißpriach, Zederhaus.
Zell am See District (Pinzgau) (28 municipalities): Bramberg am Wildkogel, Bruck an der Großglocknerstraße, Dienten am Hochkönig, Fusch an der Großglocknerstraße, Hollersbach im Pinzgau, Kaprun, Krimml, Lend, Leogang, Lofer, Maishofen, Maria Alm, Mittersill, Neukirchen am Großvenediger, Niedernsill, Piesendorf, Rauris, Saalbach-Hinterglemm, Saalfelden, Sankt Martin bei Lofer, Stuhlfelden, Taxenbach, Unken, Uttendorf, Viehhofen, Wald im Pinzgau, Weißbach bei Lofer, Zell am See.

Economy 
The Gross domestic product (GDP) of the state was 29 billion € in 2018, accounting for 7.5% of the Austria's economic output. GDP per capita adjusted for purchasing power was 46,500 € or 154% of the EU27 average in the same year. Salzburg is the state with the highest GDP per capita in Austria before Vienna.

Architecture

The Salzburg Cathedral was the first Baroque building in the German-speaking artistic world.  Two other important buildings initiated by the Salzburg archbishops were Hohenwerfen Castle and Hohensalzburg Fortress. The first Archbishop of Salzburg was Arno of Salzburg (785–821), in whose honor the world-famous hiking circuit — the Arnoweg — is named.

The predominant stylistic elements of Salzburg architecture have their origins in the Baroque and the Rococo periods.

Salzburg city's historic centre was named by UNESCO as a World Heritage Site.

Language

Austrian German is the local written language, and it can be heard especially in the cities. Austro-Bavarian is also spoken, especially in the rural areas and the common language of Salzburgerland.

Visitors' attractions

 Eisriesenwelt: the largest ice cave in the world
 Großglockner Hochalpenstraße: a panoramic road, called Grossglockner High Alpine Road
 Salzkammergut: a lake district situated in Salzburg state, Upper Austria and Styria
 Liechtensteinklamm: Salzburg is home to one of the longest and deepest gorges of the Alps, the Liechtensteinklamm. It is located near Sankt Johann im Pongau or St.Johann/Pg., a small town in the middle of the state.
 Nonnberg Abbey: a Benedictine monastery that was immortalized in the movie The Sound of Music

Sports

 Salzburgring, a permanent racing circuit, north east of the city of Salzburg
 Ski Amadé
 Kitzsteinhorn, skiing the year round on a glacier
 Icespeedway in St. Johann im Pongau
 Aperschnalzen, an old tradition of competitive whipcracking

Ski resorts

Altenmarkt im Pongau, Flachau, Wagrain, St. Johann, Zell am See (Saalbach-Hinterglemm), Obertauern, Bad Gastein, Rauris, Lofer, Hochkönig, Krispl

Assorted statistics

Tourist Regions: 21
Resort Towns: 115
Guest Beds: 192,000
Lakes: 185
Biggest lake: Wolfgangsee
Longest river: Salzach
Highest mountain: Großvenediger — elevation 
Hiking paths: 
Hill farms: 1,800 — 550 of them serving refreshments
National parks: 1
Marked cycle paths: 
Mountainbike trails (including cross-border routes):  
Golf courses: 13
Ski slopes: 
Cross-country ski trails: 
Night slopes: 14
Winter hiking paths:

Notes

References

External links

 Salzburg State Tourist Board
 Salzburg State Government
 Salzburg Travel Guide with entries for all municipalities
 Pictures from Salzburg
 Tours in and around Salzburg
 Tours

 
NUTS 2 statistical regions of the European Union
States of Austria